Brian Peter MacDonell  (born 19 May 1935) is a former New Zealand Member of Parliament for Dunedin Central in the South Island.

Early life and career
He was born in Dunedin on 19 May 1935, the son of Roderick MacDonell. He received his education at Christian Brothers High School, since renamed Kavanagh College. He became active with the labour movement in 1950. In 1958, he married Joan Banwell, the daughter of William Banwell. The MacDonells have four sons. MacDonell worked for a bank from 1953 to 1963, and was a national councillor for the New Zealand bank officers union.

Political career

MacDonell first attempted to enter politics at the 1959 local-body elections when he stood unsuccessfully for the Dunedin City Council on the Labour Party ticket. He stood for the council again in 1962 and was likewise unsuccessful.

He was Parliamentary Under-Secretary to the Minister of Trade and Industry (1973–1975) and to the Minister of Energy Resources (1974–1975). Following the Royal Commission on Contraception, Sterilisation and Abortion, parliament discussed legislation to legalise abortion, and MacDonell supported his pro-life stance by holding a jar with a pickled 12-week-old foetus during the debate. Parliament passed the Contraception, Sterilisation, and Abortion Act 1977. MacDonell was Shadow Minister of Customs and Shadow Postmaster-General from 1975 to 1983 under Bill Rowling.

The Dunedin Central electorate was abolished in the 1983 electoral redistribution, and the electorate of Dunedin West was established in its place. MacDonell was not selected as the Labour candidate for the new electorate of Dunedin West; instead, the party's president, Jim Anderton, installed his personal friend Clive Matthewson. MacDonell stood as an Independent in the 1984 general election but was not successful.

MacDonell was later elected a member of the Dunedin City Council at the 1995 local-body elections representing the South Dunedin ward for three years.

Later activities
As of 2013, MacDonell resided in Tasmania, Australia. He enjoys fishing for recreation.

Honours and awards
In 1977, MacDonell was awarded the Queen Elizabeth II Silver Jubilee Medal, and in 1990 he received the New Zealand 1990 Commemoration Medal. In the 1993 New Year Honours, he was appointed a Companion of the Queen's Service Order for public services.

Notes

References

1935 births
People educated at Trinity Catholic College, Dunedin
Living people
New Zealand Labour Party MPs
Independent MPs of New Zealand
Companions of the Queen's Service Order
Local politicians in New Zealand
New Zealand MPs for Dunedin electorates
Unsuccessful candidates in the 1984 New Zealand general election
Unsuccessful candidates in the 1960 New Zealand general election
Members of the New Zealand House of Representatives
Dunedin City Councillors